Anthony Civet (born 1 April 1997) is a French professional footballer who plays as a midfielder for Championnat National 2 club Lusitanos Saint-Maur.

Career
Civet made his professional debut with Clermont in a 3–0 Ligue 2 win over Le Havre on 14 October 2017.

On 1 February 2022, Civet moved to Chambly on a 1.5-year contract.

References

External links
 
 
 
 Clermont Foot Profile

1997 births
Living people
Sportspeople from Clermont-Ferrand
Association football midfielders
French footballers
Clermont Foot players
Marignane Gignac Côte Bleue FC players
Moulins Yzeure Foot players
FC Chambly Oise players
US Lusitanos Saint-Maur players
Ligue 2 players
Championnat National players
Championnat National 2 players
Championnat National 3 players
Footballers from Auvergne-Rhône-Alpes